The Gwangju Mo clan is a Korean clan, with a bon-gwan located in  Guangzhou, Guangdong, China (known as Gwangju in Korean). According to the census in 2015, the population of the Gwangju Mo clan was 92. Mo clan was born in Western Xia, China. King Wen in Zhou dynasty appointed his son as Mo clan, but it is not clear that how their clan was established in Korea, and the Gwangju Mo clan's founder has been still unknown.

See also 
 Korean clan names of foreign origin

References

External links 
 

Korean clan names of Chinese origin